Johannes Hendrik Conradie (13 March 1897 – 12 August 1966) was a South African politician, advocate, and judge who was a Speaker of Parliament of South Africa.

Studies
He studied at the University of Cape Town, Trinity College, Cambridge. He graduated with a Master of Arts at UCT and a Bachelor of Arts and a Bachelor of Laws at Cambridge.

Career
Johannes Conradie was a Queen's Counsel and started his career as an advocate in Cape Town, South Africa.  Over time he developed a keen interest in politics and became a member of parliament for Gordonia from 26 May 1938 to 31 December 1960. In 1951 he became Speaker of Parliament of South Africa and stayed in that position for 10 years from 19 January 1951 to 30 December 1960.
He then became Judge President of the Supreme Court of South Africa's South West Africa Division in Windhoek as from 1 January 1961.  Dr. David Gideon Conradie, a cousin or J.H. Conradie, succeeded him in death when he died in Pretoria, Gauteng, South Africa on 30 September 1967.

Personal life
Johannes Conradie was born 13 March 1897 as the son of a wine farmer, also named Johannes Hendrik Conradie from Robertson and farmed on the side all his life. His mother was Maria Wilhelmina van Eeden. He never got married, but adopted a son.  When he died 12 August 1966 his adoptive son inherited the farm Robertson. 
He was a keen tennis player and was a club member at Kelvin Grove.

External links

1897 births
1966 deaths
Expatriate judges on the courts of Namibia
Members of the House of Assembly (South Africa)
Place of birth missing
Place of death missing
South African Queen's Counsel
Speakers of the National Assembly of South Africa
University of Cape Town alumni